Master and Commander: The Far Side of the World is a 2003 American epic period war-drama film co-written, produced and directed by Peter Weir, set during the Napoleonic Wars. The film's plot and characters are adapted from three novels in author Patrick O'Brian's Aubrey–Maturin series, which includes 20 completed novels of Jack Aubrey's naval career. The film stars Russell Crowe as Aubrey, captain in the Royal Navy, and Paul Bettany as Dr. Stephen Maturin, the ship's surgeon. This is the second onscreen collaboration for Crowe and Bettany, both of whom previously co-starred in 2001’s A Beautiful Mind.

The film was a personal project of Fox executive Tom Rothman, who recruited Weir to helm the project. Filming took place on the open sea, on replica ships in the water tanks of Baja Studios, and on the Galápagos Islands. The film, which cost $150 million to make, was a co-production of 20th Century Fox, Miramax Films, Universal Pictures, and Samuel Goldwyn Films, and released on November 14, 2003. It was a moderate success at the box office, grossing $212 million worldwide.

The film was critically well received and garnered Weir the BAFTA Award for Best Direction. At the 76th Academy Awards, the film was nominated for 10 Oscars, including Best Picture and Best Director. It won Best Cinematography and Best Sound Editing, but the rest of the categories were swept by The Lord of the Rings: The Return of the King. In June 2021, a prequel film was announced to be in active development.

Plot
During the Napoleonic Wars, Captain Jack Aubrey of HMS Surprise is ordered to intercept the heavy frigate Acheron, a French privateer. Acheron ambushes Surprise off the coast of Brazil, causing heavy damage while remaining undamaged by the British guns. The ship's boats tow Surprise into a fog bank to evade pursuit. Aubrey's officers tell him that Surprise is no match for Acheron, and that they should abandon the chase. Aubrey responds that Acheron must not be allowed to plunder the British whaling fleet and orders Surprise refitted at sea, rather than a lengthy return to port for repairs. Midshipman Blakeney has his arm amputated due to injuries sustained in battle. Shortly afterward, Acheron again ambushes Surprise, but Aubrey slips away in the night by using a decoy raft and ship's lamps.

Following the privateer south, Surprise rounds Cape Horn and heads to the Galápagos Islands, where Aubrey is convinced that Acheron will prey on Britain's whaling fleet. The ship's surgeon, Stephen Maturin, is interested in the islands' unique flora and fauna, and Aubrey promises his friend several days' exploration time. However, when Surprise reaches the Galápagos, they recover the survivors of a whaling ship destroyed by Acheron. Aubrey hastily pursues the privateer, dashing Maturin's expectation of more time to explore.

Surprise is becalmed for several days. The crew becomes restless and disorderly, and superstition begins to take hold among them. Midshipman Hollom, already unpopular with the crew, is named a "Jonah" by the sailors (someone who brings bad luck to a ship). As the tension rises, crew member Nagle deliberately bumps shoulders with Hollom as he passes him on the deck and is flogged for insubordination. That night, Hollom commits suicide by jumping overboard with a cannonball; Aubrey holds a service for Hollom the next morning. The wind picks up again, and Surprise resumes the chase.

The next day, Royal Marine officer Captain Howard attempts to shoot an albatross but accidentally hits Maturin instead. The surgeon's mate informs Aubrey that unless the bullet and a piece of cloth it took with it are removed soon, they will fester. He also recommends the delicate operation be performed on land. Despite closing on Acheron, Aubrey takes the doctor back to the Galápagos. Maturin performs surgery on himself using a mirror. Finally giving up the pursuit of the privateer, Aubrey grants Maturin the chance to explore the Galápagos Islands and gather specimens before they head for home. While looking for a species of flightless cormorant, the doctor discovers Acheron on the other side of the island. Maturin abandons most of his specimens and hurries to warn Aubrey. Surprise readies for battle once more. Due to Acherons stronger hull, Surprise must be at close quarters to damage her. After observing the camouflage ability of one of Maturin's specimens, Aubrey disguises Surprise as a whaling ship; he hopes the French will be lured in to capture the valuable ship rather than destroy it. Acheron falls for the disguise, and Surprise launches her attack. With the back wheels of the cannons taken off, the cannons are angled upward and fire upon Acherons mainmast while Captain Howard's Marine sharpshooters pick off the crew of Acheron from above. Acheron is disabled when the mainmast snaps and falls into the sea. Aubrey leads boarding parties, engaging in fierce hand-to-hand combat. Upon capturing the ship, Aubrey is informed by the ship's doctor that the French captain is dead and is given the Captain's sword.

Acheron and Surprise are repaired and Surprise remains in the Galápagos. Pullings is promoted to captain and ordered to sail the captured Acheron to Valparaíso. As Acheron sails away, Maturin mentions that their doctor had died months ago. Realising the French captain deceived him by pretending to be the ship's doctor, Aubrey gives the order to change course to intercept Acheron and escort her to Valparaíso, and for the crew to assume battle stations. Maturin is again denied the chance to explore the Galápagos, but Aubrey wryly notes that since the bird he seeks is flightless, "it's not going anywhere." The two then play Musica notturna delle strade di Madrid by Luigi Boccherini as Surprise turns in pursuit of Acheron once more.

Cast

 Russell Crowe as Jack Aubrey
 Paul Bettany as Stephen Maturin, Surgeon
 James D'Arcy as First Lieutenant Thomas Pullings
 Edward Woodall as Second Lieutenant William Mowett
 Chris Larkin as Captain Howard, Royal Marines
 Robert Pugh as John Allen, Master
 Max Benitz as Midshipman/Acting Third Lieutenant Peter Myles Calamy
 Max Pirkis as Midshipman Lord William Blakeney
 Lee Ingleby as Midshipman Hollom
 Richard McCabe as Mr. Higgins, Surgeon's Mate
 Ian Mercer as Mr. Hollar, Boatswain
 Tony Dolan as Mr. Lamb, Carpenter
 David Threlfall as Preserved Killick, Captain's Steward
 Billy Boyd as Barrett Bonden, Coxswain
 Bryan Dick as Joseph Nagle, Carpenter's Mate
 Joseph Morgan as William Warley, Captain of the Mizzentop
 George Innes as Joe Plaice, Able Seaman
 Patrick Gallagher as Awkward Davies, Able Seaman
 John DeSantis as Padeen Colman, Loblolly Boy
 Mark Lewis Jones as Mr. Hogg, Master of the Whaler Albatross

In trying to find men who looked as though they were from the 19th century, Weir recruited many extras from Poland. Philip French noted that the casting of Crowe, an Australian, as a British naval hero followed a tradition in film (e.g. Errol Flynn as Geoffrey Thorpe in The Sea Hawk, Peter Finch as Lord Nelson in Bequest to the Nation, and Mel Gibson as Fletcher Christian in The Bounty).

Production

Source material

The film is drawn from the Aubrey–Maturin novels by Patrick O'Brian, but matches the events in no one novel. The author drew from real events in the Napoleonic Wars, as he describes in the introduction to the first novel, Master and Commander. Many have speculated as to which Royal Navy captain matches the fictional character most. The Royal Navy Museum considers Captain Lord Cochrane as the inspiration for the character in the first novel, Master and Commander. No specific real life captain completely matches Aubrey, but the exploits of two naval captains inspired events in the novels, Captain Thomas Cochrane, and Captain William Woolsey. Cochrane used the ruse of placing a light on a floating barrel at night to avoid capture. Woolsey, aboard HMS Papillon, disguised a ship under his command as a commercial boat; on discovering information that a rogue ship was on the other side of a small island, he sailed around the island and captured the Spanish ship by stratagem, on April 15, 1805.

The film combines elements from 3 different novels of Patrick O'Brian, but the basic plot mostly comes from his tenth novel The Far Side of the World. However, in the film version, the action takes place in 1805, during the Napoleonic wars, instead of 1812 during the War of 1812, as the producers wished to avoid offending American audiences. In consequence, the fictional opponent was changed from USS Norfolk to the French privateer frigate Acheron. Acheron in the film was reconstructed by the film's special-effects team who took stem-to-stern digital scans of USS Constitution at her berth in Boston, from which the computer model of Acheron was rendered. The film excludes scenes in ports, and, besides Brazilian women in a single scene, the novels' female characters were not adapted.

The episode in which Aubrey deceives the enemy by means of a raft bearing lanterns is taken from Master and Commander, while the episode in which Maturin directs surgery on himself, while gritting his teeth in pain, to remove a bullet is taken from HMS Surprise. The stern chase around Cape Horn is taken from the novel Desolation Island, although Acheron replaced the Dutch 74-gun warship Waakzaamheid, Surprise replaced Leopard, and in the book it is Aubrey who is being pursued around the Cape of Good Hope.

Development
20th Century Fox executive Tom Rothman had wished to adapt O'Brian's novels since first reading them, recognizing the potential for a film franchise. Becoming CEO, he recruited director Peter Weir to helm the project.

Filming

Great efforts were made to reproduce the authentic look and feel of life aboard an early nineteenth-century man-of-war. In addition to 2,000 hats and 1,900 pairs of shoes, some 400 pounds of hair were used on actors.

However, only ten days of the filming took place at sea aboard Rose (a reproduction of the 18th-century post ship HMS Rose). Other scenes were shot on a full-scale replica mounted on gimbals in a nearly 20-million-gallon tank at Baja Studios in Mexico, built for the filming of Titanic (1997).

There was a third HMS Surprise which was a scale model built by Weta Workshop. A storm sequence was enhanced using digitally composited footage of waves shot on board a modern replica of Cook's Endeavour rounding Cape Horn. All of the actors were given a thorough grounding in the naval life of the period in order to make their performances as authentic as possible. The ship's boats used in the film were Russian Naval six- and four-oared yawls supplied by Central Coast Charters and Boat Base Monterey. Their faithful 18th-century appearance complemented the historical accuracy of the rebuilt "Rose," whose own boat, the "Thorn", could be used only in the Brazilian scene.

Master and Commander was the first non-documentary film to shoot on-location in the Galápagos. Filming took place from June to November 2002.

Sound
Sound designer Richard King earned Master and Commander an Oscar for its sound effects by going to great lengths to record realistic sounds, particularly for the battle scenes and the storm scenes. King and director Peter Weir began by spending months reading the Patrick O'Brian novels in search of descriptions of the sounds that would have been heard on board the ship—for example, the "screeching bellow" of cannon fire and the "deep howl" of a cannonball passing overhead.

King worked with the film's Lead Historical Consultant Gordon Laco, who located collectors in Michigan who owned a 24-pounder and a 12-pounder cannon. King, Laco, and two assistants went to Michigan and recorded the sounds of the cannon firing at a nearby National Guard base. They placed microphones near the cannon to get the "crack" of the cannon fire, and also about  downrange to record the "shrieking" of the chain shot as it passed overhead. They also recorded the sounds of bar shot and grape shot passing overhead, and later mixed the sounds of all three types of shot for the battle scenes.

For the sounds of the shot hitting the ships, they set up wooden targets at the artillery range and blasted them with the cannon, but found the sonic results underwhelming. Instead, they returned to Los Angeles and there recorded sounds of wooden barrels being destroyed. King sometimes added the "crack" of a rifle shot to punctuate the sound of a cannonball hitting a ship's hull.

For the sound of wind in the storm as the ship rounds Cape Horn, King devised a wooden frame rigged with one thousand feet of line and set it in the back of a pickup truck. By driving the truck at  into a  wind, and modulating the wind with barbecue and refrigerator grills, King was able to create a range of sounds, from "shrieking" to "whistling" to "sighing", simulating the sounds of wind passing through the ship's rigging.

Richard Tognetti, who scored the film's music, taught Crowe how to play the violin, as Aubrey plays the violin with Maturin on his cello in the movie. Crowe purchased the violin personally as the budget did not allow for the expense. The violin was made in 1890 by the Italian violin maker Leandro Bisiach, and sold at auction in 2018 for US$104,000. Bettany learned how to play the cello for the role of Maturin, so the pair could be filmed playing with proper posture and technique instead of miming. The recording was dubbed in the final version of the film.

Music 
Iva Davies, lead singer of the Australian band Icehouse, traveled to Los Angeles to record the soundtrack to the film with Christopher Gordon and Richard Tognetti. Together, they won the 2004 APRA/AGSC Screen Music Award in the "Best Soundtrack Album" category. The score includes an assortment of baroque and classical music, notably the first of Johann Sebastian Bach's Suites for Unaccompanied Cello, Suite No. 1 in G major, BWV 1007, played by Yo-Yo Ma; the Strassburg theme in the third movement of Wolfgang Amadeus Mozart's Violin Concerto No. 3; the third (Adagio) movement of Corelli's Christmas Concerto (Concerto grosso in G minor, Op. 6, No. 8); and a recurring rendition of Ralph Vaughan Williams's Fantasia on a Theme of Thomas Tallis. The music played on violin and cello before the end is Luigi Boccherini's String Quintet (Quintettino) for 2 violins, viola & 2 cellos in C major ("Musica notturna delle strade di Madrid"), G. 324 Op. 30. The two arrangements of this cue contained in the CD differ significantly from the one heard in the movie.

The song sung in the wardroom is "Don't Forget Your Old Shipmates", a British Navy song written in the early 1800s and arranged in 1978 by Jim Mageean from his album Of Ships... and Men. The tunes sung and played by the crew on deck at night are "O'Sullivan's March", "Spanish Ladies" and "The British Tars" ("The shipwrecked tar"), which was set to tune of "Bonnie Ship the Diamond" and called "Raging Sea/Bonnie Ship the Diamond" on the soundtrack.

Release and reception

Theatrical release 
On November 17, 2003, Master and Commander  had its UK Premiere at the 57th Royal Film Performance, a fundraising event held in aid of The Film and TV Charity.

Box office 
Hoping to draw adults during the film awards seasons, Master and Commander was slated for a release in mid-November 2003. However, the film failed to reach the No. 1 spot on its opening weekend. It opened #2 behind Christmas comedy Elf in the first weekend of North American release, November 14–16, 2003, earning $25,105,990. It dropped to the #4 position in the second weekend and #6 in the third, and finished the domestic run with $93,927,920 in gross receipts. Outside the U.S. and Canada, the film grossed $118,083,191, doing best in Italy (at $15,111,841). The film grossed $212 million globally, barely recouping its $150 million budget.

Despite the success of Gladiator in 2000, also starring Crowe, the historical epic had lost much of its popularity among general audiences by the time of the Master and Commander release. In 2003, the box office was largely dominated by escapist and fantasy films, such as X2: X-Men United, Finding Nemo, Pirates of the Caribbean: The Curse of the Black Pearl, and The Lord of the Rings: The Return of the King. In addition to being more erudite, Master and Commander realistic and gruesome depiction of combat may have been too serious for audiences during the holiday season. O'Brian's novels also had little name recognition.

Critical response 
On review aggregate website Rotten Tomatoes, 85% of 219 critics gave the film an overall positive review, with an average rating of 7.6/10. The site's critics consensus states: "Russell Crowe's rough charm is put to good use in this masterful adaptation of Patrick O'Brian's novel." On Metacritic, the film has a weighted average score of 81 out of 100 based on 42 critics, indicating "universal acclaim". Audiences polled by CinemaScore gave the film an average grade of "B+" on an A+ to F scale.

Roger Ebert gave the film 4 stars out of 4, saying that "it achieves the epic without losing sight of the human". The Guardians Peter Bradshaw praised the film and Crowe's performance. New York Times critic A. O. Scott described the film as "stupendously entertaining". However, Jason Epstein, also writing for The New York Times, criticized the film, taking issue with changes from the novel, Crowe's "one-dimensional action hero", and implausible events in the script.

Christopher Hitchens gave a mixed review: "Any cinematic adaptation of O'Brian must stand or fall by its success in representing this figure [Dr. Stephen Maturin]. On this the film doesn't even fall, let alone stand. It skips the whole project." (The film omits completely the fact that the doctor and naturalist is also a spy for England—a key plot element in the novels.) Hitchens nonetheless praised the action scenes, writing: "In one respect the action lives up to its fictional and actual inspiration. This was the age of Bligh and Cook and of voyages of discovery as well as conquest, and when HMS Surprise makes landfall in the Galapagos Islands we get a beautifully filmed sequence about how the dawn of scientific enlightenment might have felt."

San Francisco Chronicle film reviewer Mick LaSalle was generally downbeat and, after praising director Weir's handling of scenes with no dialogue, observed that "Weir is less surefooted as a screenwriter. Having not read any of O'Brian's novels, I can't say if the fault is in Weir's adaptation or in the source material, but halfway into 'Master and Commander,' the friendship of the captain and the doctor begins to seem schematic, as if all the positive traits that an individual could have were divided equally between these two guys, just so they can argue. Their interaction takes on a preening quality, reminiscent of the interaction of the 'Star Trek' characters four or five movies down the line. We come to realize that the specific adventure matters little except as a showcase for these personalities. Once that happens, the story involving the French ship loses much of its interest and all of its danger, and the movie starts taking on water. 'Master and Commander' stays afloat to the finish, but that's all that can be said."

Accolades

At the 76th Academy Awards in 2004, Master and Commander received ten nominations: Best Cinematography, Best Sound Editing, Best Picture, Best Director, Best Art Direction, Best Costume Design, Best Film Editing, Best Makeup, Best Sound Mixing and Best Visual Effects. It won the awards for Best Cinematography and Best Sound Editing but lost the rest to The Return of the King. The film also garnered Weir the BAFTA Award for Best Direction.

Legacy

Weir, asked in 2005 if he would make a sequel, stated he thought it "most unlikely", and after internet rumors to the contrary, stated "I think that while it did well...ish at the box office, it didn't generate that monstrous, rapid income that provokes a sequel." In 2007 the film was included on a list of "13 Failed Attempts To Start Film Franchises" by The A.V. Club, noting that "this surely stands as one of the most exciting opening salvos in nonexistent-series history, and the Aubrey–Maturin novels remain untapped cinematic ground."

In December 2010, Crowe launched an appeal on Twitter to get the sequel made: "If you want a Master and Commander sequel I suggest you e-mail Tom Rothman at Fox and let him know your thoughts".

Film critic Scott Tobias wrote a positive retrospective article about this film in 2019, begrudging the fact that Pirates of the Caribbean: The Curse of the Black Pearl, another sea-faring film also released in 2003, had led to a string of Pirates of the Caribbean fantasy films, but there was no demand for a sequel featuring Captain Jack Aubrey and deeply rooted in historical facts of the Napoleonic Wars, the Age of Sail and the Age of Discovery.

In summer 2020, Vulture noted that the "film is ripe for reappraisal." In January 2021, Crowe publicly defended the film from criticism. A March 2023 story in GQ noted the film's continued popularity among millennial men who were watching the film on streaming services. It theorized that this was in part due to the film's portrayal of "non-toxic masculinity" and strong male friendships, particularly the one between Aubrey and Maturin. "Overall, the masculinity of Master and Commander ... is overwhelmingly wholesome and positive," reporter Gabriella Paiella wrote. "Any nostalgia for the traditionalism in the movie is less reactionary and more about the healthy male bonding between the characters." That was contrasted with continued problems with male bonding among 2020s American men.

Prequel
In June 2021, it was reported that a second film is in development by 20th Century Studios, a prequel based on the first novel only, with Patrick Ness penning the script.

Notes

References

Bibliography

Further reading

External links 

 A Literary Companion to the Film which explores the film's connections to the Aubrey Maturin series
 
 
 
 
 
Master and Commander: The Far Side of the World with Gordon Laco at Based on a True Story

2003 films
2000s adventure drama films
2000s historical films
2000s war drama films
20th Century Fox films
2000s action drama films
American action drama films
American adventure drama films
American war drama films
American epic films
American historical films
APRA Award winners
BAFTA winners (films)
Films about naval warfare
Films based on British novels
Films based on military novels
Films based on multiple works of a series
Films directed by Peter Weir
Films set in the 1800s
Films set in 1805
Films set on the Galápagos Islands
Films set on ships
Films shot in Ecuador
Films shot in Mexico
Films that won the Best Sound Editing Academy Award
Films whose cinematographer won the Best Cinematography Academy Award
Films whose director won the Best Direction BAFTA Award
Miramax films
Napoleonic Wars films
Napoleonic Wars in fiction
Napoleonic Wars naval films
Samuel Goldwyn Films films
Films with screenplays by John Collee
Sea adventure films
Seafaring films
Films about the Royal Navy
Universal Pictures films
War epic films
2003 drama films
2000s English-language films
2000s American films